Harry Asbjørn Hestad (born 7 November 1944) is a Norwegian former football player and coach.
Just as his brother Stein Olav Hestad, Hestad played for Molde almost his entire career, only interrupted by two seasons in the Dutch club FC Den Haag. He was also an active player for the Norwegian national team from 1969 through 1976, scoring five goals in 31 matches.

Club career

Molde FK
Hestad was born in Molde, and played 503 games for the local team Molde FK. He made his debut in 1961, and in 1969 he became player-manager together with Torkild Brakstad.

FC Den Haag
Hestad played for FC Den Haag together with Harald Berg for two seasons. His team played the final of the 1971–72 KNVB Cup, where Den Haag lost 2–3 against Ajax. In the Eredivisie, Den Haag achieved a 3rd and 4th place during his time at the club.

Second spell at Molde
Hestad returned to Molde in 1972 after two season in Netherlands, and spent the second half of the 1972 season as player-coach alongside Torkild Brakstad. On 25 June 1972, he played his first game after his return, a second tier game Molde lost 2–4 away against Steinkjer. Hestad was a part of the Molde team who won silver medal in the 1974 1. divisjon, the club's first medal in the top division. He played for Molde for the rest of his career until he retired in 1979.

International career
Harry Hestad was capped 31 times for Norway, scoring five goals. He made his debut against Mexico on 8 May 1969. 
His first two international goals came against Guatemala, in a Friendly match on 13 November 1969, a game Norway won 3–1.
His last international appearance was against Denmark on 24 June 1976.

International goals
Scores and results list Norway's goal tally first.

Source:

Managerial career
From 1986 to 1989, he was head coach at Molde alongside Åge Hareide. Under their leadership, Molde finished 2nd in the league in 1987, 3rd in 1988 and lost the 1989 Cup Final.
He was also the head coach of Træff in 1995, and later on Malmefjorden and Fræna.

Personal life
He is the brother of Stein Olav Hestad, with whom he was a teammate for several seasons at Molde, and the uncle of former footballer Daniel Berg Hestad.

References

External links
 Norwegian football players abroad
 

1944 births
Living people
People from Molde
Norwegian footballers
Norway international footballers
Norwegian expatriate footballers
Eliteserien players
Norwegian First Division players
Molde FK players
ADO Den Haag players
Eredivisie players
Expatriate footballers in the Netherlands
Norwegian expatriate sportspeople in the Netherlands
Norwegian football managers
Molde FK managers
Association football wingers
Sportspeople from Møre og Romsdal